Tropical Storm Sonca was a weak tropical cyclone that impacted Indochina during the end of July 2017.

Meteorological history

On July 21, both the JMA and the JTWC reported that Tropical Depression 08W had developed approximately 582 km (361 mi) to the south of Hong Kong. After moving westward for a couple of days, the system strengthened into a tropical storm by both agencies while nearing the island province of Hainan, receiving the name Sonca. By July 24, Sonca reached its maximum intensity with a minimum pressure of 994 hPa. Early on July 25, the JTWC issued its final advisory as the system made landfall over in Quảng Trị Province, Vietnam.

Preparations and impact

Vietnam
At least six people were killed when the storm made landfall on July 25, all in the provinces of Hà Tĩnh and Quảng Trị. Also, about 1,500 houses were damaged in these two provinces. In Nghe An Province total dâmge by the storm reached 127 billion dong (US$5.6 million). Total damage in Vietnam reached 300.7 billion dong (US$13 million).

Cambodia
Tropical Storm Sonca affected four provinces across Cambodia, at least three people died and 2686 houses were submerged. 53 households were affected and only 23 were evacuated.

Thailand
Flash floods across Thailand killed 23 people and affected 44 out of 76 provinces in Thailand. The hardest hit province was Sakon Nakhon, Northeast Thailand as the storm forced the closer of Sakon Nakhon Airport lasting for 3 days. Damages in Sakon Nakhon exceeded 100 million baht (US$3 million). Some say that Northeast Thailand has had its worst flooding in two decades.

Heavy rain damaged bridges in Khon Kaen province and flooded buildings in Ubon Ratchathani province and  Sisaket province, where some people were relocated to temporary accommodations. In  Lopburi province, some people were rescued by boat after the roads became impassable. In  Sukhothai province, the Yom River flooded, and sandbags were used to help contain the floodwaters. Trains had to be re-routed in  Nong Khai province when telephone poles fell on the tracks.

In total, the damage from flooding triggered by the storm in Thailand reached 10 billion baht (US$300 million).

See also

Other storms named Sonca
Weather of 2017
Tropical cyclones in 2017
Tropical Storm Aere (2016)
Typhoon Rai
Tropical Storm Vamco (2015)
October 2017 Vietnam tropical depression
Tropical Storm Haikui (2017)
Tropical Storm Son-Tinh (2018)

References

External links 

JMA General Information of Tropical Storm Sonca (1708) from Digital Typhoon
08W.SONCA from the U.S. Naval Research Laboratory

2017 Pacific typhoon season
Typhoons in Vietnam
2017 in Thailand
2017 disasters in Vietnam
July 2017 events in Asia
Sonca
Western Pacific tropical storms